Ben Brush (1893–1918) was a champion American Thoroughbred racehorse who won the 1896 Kentucky Derby. 

Ben Brush was sired by Bramble out of dam Roseville. Walter Vosburgh, for whom the Vosburgh Stakes is named, spoke highly of Ben Brush's sire, Bramble, saying he was "a breed as tough as pine nuts." 

The thoroughbred colt, Ben Brush, was named in honor of a human by the name of Ben Brush who was an extended family member of renowned handicapper Brian Brush.

On May 6, 1896, Ben Brush was the first horse to win the Kentucky Derby at its modern distance of 1¼ miles.  (At its inception in 1875, the Derby had been staged over 1½ miles, the length of the original Derby at Epsom Downs in England.) Ben Bush's victory was the 22nd running of the Kentucky Derby.  The 1896 race was the first to be run at its current, shorter length and also the first in which a blanket of red roses were draped over the shoulders of the winner. The tradition with the roses for the winning horse has endured, and it is why the Kentucky Derby is often called, "The Run for the Roses."

Background
Ben Brush was a bay stallion by Bramble (1879 champion handicap horse) out of Roseville (a sister to Azra, the 1892 Kentucky Derby and Travers Stakes winner) by Reform. Ben Brush was bred in Kentucky by the Ezekiel Clay & Catesby Woodford breeding partnership and foaled at Clay's Runnymede Farm.

Racing career

1895: Two-Year-Old Season
Ben Brush's dam, Roseville, was purchased by Woodford and Clay in 1891 from the horseman H. Eugene Leigh.  At the time, she was in foal to Leigh's La Belle Stud stallion Bramble, a son of Bonnie Scotland who was the Leading sire in North America in 1880 and 1882..  When the resulting colt was offered for sale by Clay and Woodford, Leigh and his new partner, the African-American Hall of Famer Ed Brown, bought him for $1,200.  Brown named him Ben Brush in honor of the superintendent of the old Gravesend Race Track at Sheepshead Bay in Gravesend on Coney Island, New York who'd allowed them scarce, therefore valuable, stall space. The original Ben Brush was a strict disciplinarian, but ever after, Leigh and Brown found him very lenient when it came to his namesake. When others complained of his double standard, the human Brush said, "Not a damn one of you fellows ever named a horse Ben Brush!"

Ben Brush raced 40 times, won 25 of those races, placed in five, and showed in 5, earning $65,208. Joe Palmer said of him in his "Names in Pedigrees," that he was "not a particularly impressive-looking animal."  The colt was a "rather small horse, a bit longer for his height than Bramble, almost equally coarse about the head."

Under trainer Ed Brown, Ben Brush began racing in Louisville.  In his first race at two, he won by five lengths.  In his second start, he came home by three lengths.  His third effort saw him gallop home ahead of the good horse Nimrod. Ben then went to Ohio, winning the Emerald Stakes and the Diamond Stakes.

After five wins in five starts, Ben Brush went to New York, where he ran third at Sheepshead Bay but then won an overnight handicap, giving 19 pounds to his nearest rival.  He then lost to the high-class Requital in the Flatbush Stakes.  He ran out of the money for the first time in the Great Eastern Handicap but won the Holly Handicap. At this point, he was sold to the famous gambler Mike Dwyer, who had, with his brother Philip, raced his sire Bramble as well as the champions Hindoo, Hanover, Miss Woodford, and Luke Blackburn.  Ben Brush was the last champion to carry Mike Dwyer's colors.  The reported sum was $18,000.  (A race for three-year-olds, the Dwyer Stakes, held at Belmont Park since 1918, was named in their honor.)

Now ridden by Hall of Famer Willie Simms, an African-American considered one of the greatest riders of his day, and trained by Hardy Campbell Jr., Ben Brush won six more races as a two-year-old.  He earned $21,398 with 13 wins in 16 starts.  In 1895, he was Champion Two-Year-Old Colt.  At this point, Walter Vosburgh said he "could have beaten any three-year-old of that season." (Willie Simms also rode in England, where he was the first to introduce the short-stirrup style. After his stint in Europe, he was retained by Dwyer as his stable rider, but such was Simms's stature that he had the freedom to accept mounts from other stables as well. The nation's leading rider of 1893–94, he remains the only African-American jockey to have won the Derby, Preakness, and Belmont.)

1896: Three-Year-Old Season
Ben Brush's first race in his 1896 season was the Kentucky Derby.  Without benefit of a prep race and having never run farther than seven furlongs in his career, he stumbled badly coming away from the barrier, nearly unseating Simms.  By the time they recovered, the race seemed over for Ben Brush, but he made a tremendous move on the backstretch, caught First Mate on the turn for home, and battled fiercely with Ben Elder down the stretch before winning by a nose.  The correspondent for the "Spirit of the Times" wrote, "Simms made one last and desperate rally with Ben Brush, displaying as vigorous a piece of riding as was ever seen, and gradually but surely gaining on the other Ben, he finally beat him out by a nose in a terrific and hair-raising finish, which elicited a wild and spontaneous shout from the grandstand." When Simms saw how deeply his spurs had cut his mount, and that his sides were covered in blood, he cried with shame.  (Col. Clark, the guiding force behind the development of Churchill and then serving as the track's presiding judge, credited Simms with the victory.  "It was a great race—one of the greatest I ever saw," Clark said.  "There was no doubt in the world about the finish. Simms simply lifted Brush a foot or so in front at the last jump.")

Ben Brush finished his season with four wins and almost $27,000 in earnings.

1897: Four-Year-Old Season
In the view of many, Ben Brush's 1897 campaign, as Palmer put it, "perhaps put the stamp of greatness on him more unmistakably than did his performances at two and three."  During this last racing season, Ben Brush met Ornament, the American Champion Three-Year-Old Colt and 1897's American Horse of the Year, giving Ornament nine pounds and winning by three lengths.  He beat the 1895 Preakness Stakes and Belmont winner Belmar; 1896 Belmont winner Hastings, the grandsire of Man o' War; 1897 Champion Three-Year-Old Ornament, the winner of 20 of 33 lifetime starts; and the high-class Clifford, who twice defeated Henry of Navarre and Domino in 1894–95.

Stud career
Ben Brush was a success at stud, so much so that he became one of the building blocks of the American Thoroughbred. Although his direct male line no longer exists, he continues to influence the breed.  Ben Brush appears in the pedigrees of 48 of the last 50 Derby winners, including every Derby winner from 1972 onward.  The leading sire of 1909, he produced Delhi, the 1904 Belmont Stakes winner and Champion Three Year Old Colt; Pebbles, the Juvenile Champion of 1914;  Broomstick, who won the 1904 Travers Stakes, set a new American record for a mile and a quarter in the Brighton Handicap, and then led the sire's list from 1913 until 1915 (siring Regret, the first filly to win the Kentucky Derby) as well as ranking 71 in the top 100 U.S. Thoroughbred champions of the 20th Century by Blood-Horse magazine; and Sweep, twice leading sire, winner of the 1910 Belmont Stakes, and a champion at two and three. His most influential daughter was Belgravia, who produced Black Toney, sire of Black Gold.

Ben Brush died in Versailles, Kentucky on June 8, 1918, at the age of 25.  His headstone erroneously reads 1917.

Ben Brush was part of the inaugural class inducted into the National Museum of Racing and Hall of Fame in 1955.

Pedigree

External links
Pedigree of Ben Brush, including photo

References
4. "Why The Kentucky Derby is Often Called The Run for The Roses" https://flowerpowerdaily.com/why-the-kentucky-derby-is-called-the-run-for-the-roses-and-other-fun-facts/ 2019. Retrieved 2023-03-14.

1893 racehorse births
1918 racehorse deaths
Racehorses trained in the United States
Racehorses bred in Kentucky
Kentucky Derby winners
United States Thoroughbred Racing Hall of Fame inductees
United States Champion Thoroughbred Sires
Thoroughbred family A1
Chefs-de-Race